Dadu No. 1 is a 2004 Bengali film directed by Sanat Dutta and produced by Naresh Kumar Jain. The film features actors Ferdous Ahmed, Ranjit Mallick and Rachana Banerjee in the lead roles. Malay Ganguly composed the music for the film.

Cast 
 Ferdous Ahmed as Akash
 Ranjit Mallick as Bhabani Chatterjee
 Rachana Banerjee as Jotti
 Indrajit Chakraborty as Surya
 Mrinal Mukherjee
 Amarnath Mukhopadhyay
 Ramen Raychowdhury
 Dhiman Chakraborty
 Manjil Bandyopadhyay
 Sandhita Chatterjee

Soundtrack 

Music of Dadu No. 1 has been composed by Malay Ganguly. The soundtrack album also consists of a Rabindra Sangeet song, "Chokher Aaloy".

Track listing

References 

2004 films
2000s Bengali-language films
Bengali-language Indian films